Jean-Pierre Bourguignon (born 21 July 1947) is a French mathematician, working in the field of differential geometry.

Biography
Born in Lyon, he studied at École Polytechnique in Palaiseau, graduating in 1969. For his graduate studies he went to Paris Diderot University, where he obtained his PhD in 1974 under the direction of Marcel Berger.

He was president of the Société Mathématique de France from 1990 to 1992. From 1995 to 1998, he was president of the European Mathematical Society. He was director of the Institut des Hautes Études Scientifiques near Paris from 1994 to 2013.  Between 1 January 2014 and 31 December 2019 he was the President of the European Research Council.

Selected publications

Articles

 with H. Blaine Lawson and James Simons: 
 with H. Blaine Lawson: 
 with Jean-Pierre Ezin:

Books
 
 with Oussama Hijazi, Jean-Louis Milhorat, Andrei Moroianu and Sergiu Moroianu: 
 as editor with Rolf Jeltsch, Alberto Adrego Pinto, and Marcelo Viana:

References

External links
 
 An Interview with Jean-Pierre Bourguignon

1947 births
Living people
Scientists from Lyon
20th-century French mathematicians
21st-century French mathematicians
École Polytechnique alumni
Paris Diderot University alumni
Academic staff of École Polytechnique
Academic staff of the University of Paris
Differential geometers
Members of Academia Europaea
Presidents of the European Mathematical Society